The 1987 Sun Belt Conference men's soccer season was the 11th season of men's soccer in the conference.

Changes from 1986 

 This was the first season that a regular season trophy was awarded.

Teams

Regular season

Postseason

Sun Belt Tournament 
The tournament was held in Norfolk, Virginia.

All-Sun Belt awards and teams

See also 
 1987 NCAA Division I men's soccer season
 1987 Sun Belt Conference Men's Soccer Tournament
 1987 Sun Belt Conference women's soccer season

References 

 
1987 NCAA Division I men's soccer season